The Microsoft Lumia 540 is a low-cost smartphone from the Microsoft Lumia family.

Unlike its predecessor, the Lumia 540 is equipped with a 720p display, but otherwise has internal specifications similar to earlier devices in the Lumia 5xx series. It comes pre-installed with Windows Phone 8.1 Update 2 (with Lumia Denim firmware), and is upgradable to Windows 10 Mobile.

Due to its position as a low-cost device, the Lumia 540 is only available in Italy, India, the Middle East, Africa, and Asia.

Specifications

Hardware 

The Lumia 540 has a 5.0-inch IPS LCD display, quad-core 1.2 GHz Cortex-A7 Qualcomm Snapdragon 200 processor, 1 GB of RAM and 8 GB of internal storage that can be expanded using microSD cards up to 256 GB. The phone has a 2200 mAh Li-Ion battery, 8 MP rear camera and 5 MP front-facing camera. It is available in orange, white, black, grey and blue.

Software 

The Lumia 540 ships with Windows Phone 8.1 with Lumia Denim update.

Reception 

The Microsoft Lumia 540 Dual SIM was well received but was criticized for not offering an upgrade over earlier devices from the Lumia 5xx series.

See also 
 Microsoft Lumia
 Microsoft Lumia 535
 Microsoft Lumia 550
 Microsoft Lumia 640

References 

Microsoft Lumia
Mobile phones introduced in 2015
Discontinued smartphones
Windows Phone devices
Microsoft hardware
Mobile phones with user-replaceable battery